Ronnie Harris (born December 15, 1956) is an American former sprinter. He was a seven-time All-American at the University of Tennessee.

References

1956 births
Living people
American male sprinters
Universiade medalists in athletics (track and field)
Place of birth missing (living people)
Universiade gold medalists for the United States
Medalists at the 1979 Summer Universiade